Edoardo Leo (born 21 April 1972) is an Italian actor, director and screenwriter.

Life and career 
Born  in Rome,  Leo, a graduate in Literature and Philosophy from the Sapienza University of Rome, started attending acting courses at young age and made his professional debut in 1995, in the TV-movie La luna rubata. He had his breakout in 2003, with the role of Marcello in the TV-series Un medico in famiglia.

In 2009, Leo debuted as screenwriter and director with the road movie 18 Years Later, which got him some awards at several international film festivals, a nomination at David di Donatello for Best New Director  and a nomination for a Nastro d'Argento in the same category. In 2014 he received the Nino Manfredi Prize at the Silver Ribbon Awards. His 2015 film The Legendary Giulia and Other Miracles won the David di Donatello of the Youth and the Nastro d'Argento for best comedy film.

Filmography

References

External links 
 
 

1972 births
20th-century Italian male actors
21st-century Italian male actors
Italian male film actors
Italian male television actors
Italian male stage actors
Male actors from Rome
Living people
Italian film directors
Italian screenwriters
Italian male screenwriters
Sapienza University of Rome alumni